Alan Vernon Curtis (30 July 1930 – 18 February 2021) was an English actor and cricket announcer.

Life and career
Curtis was born in Coulsdon, Surrey in July 1930. He had a long career in the film, television and theatre, which included appearances in four films of cult director Pete Walker. 

He also served as an announcer for the MCC at Lord's Cricket Ground for 28 years.

Curtis lived in Chiswick, where he died in February 2021 aged 90.

Filmography

Film
 Ladies Who Do (1963) - 2nd Businessman (uncredited)
 Tomorrow at Ten (1965) - Inspector
 Agente Logan - missione Ypotron (1966) - Streich
 Carry On Henry (1971) - Conte di Pisa
 Die Screaming, Marianne (1971) - Sloopy's Manager
 Four Dimensions of Greta (1972) - Carl Roberts
 The Flesh and Blood Show (1972) - Jack Phipps
 Carry On Abroad (1972) - Police Chief
 Tiffany Jones (1973) - Marocek
 Professor Popper's Problem (1974) - Grainger
 The Vision (1988) - Lord Mallory

Television
 The Avengers - Mission to Montreal (1962) - Brand
 The Saint - The Death Penalty - Trape
 The Saint - The Golden Frog - Vargas
 Doctor Who - The War Machines (1966) - Major Green
 Morecambe and Wise (1969-1971) - Bank Manager / King Philip of Spain / Inspector Crump 
 Up Pompeii in "The Peace Treaty" (1970) - Captain Bumptius
 On the Buses (TV series) in Episode 2 of Series 4, "The Canteen Girl") (1970) - Mr. Stewart
 Jason King - An Author in Search of Two Characters (1972) - Commissionaire
 Whoops Baghdad (1973) - Captain of the Guards / Havabanana / Sheikh Akabar the Vile / Robber

Theatre appearances
 The Players' Theatre
 Peter Pan ... as Captain Hook
 Aladdin at the London Palladium as Abanazar
 Robinson Crusoe at the London Palladium as Will Atkins, the Pirate
 Babes in the Wood at the London Palladium as the Sheriff of Nottingham

References

External links

1930 births
2021 deaths
English male film actors
English male stage actors
English male television actors
Male actors from London
People from Carshalton
People from Coulsdon
Place of death missing